Westerbroek (abbreviation: Wte) was a railway stop in the village of Westerbroek in the Netherlands. It was situated on the Harlingen–Nieuweschans railway between the railway stations of Groningen and Kropswolde. Train services started on 1 January 1905 and were operated by the Maatschappij tot Exploitatie van Staatsspoorwegen (Company for Exploitation of State Railways). The railway stop was closed on 22 May 1932.

References 

Defunct railway stations in Groningen (province)
Railway stations closed in 1932
Railway stations on the Staatslijn B
Railway stations opened in 1905
1905 establishments in the Netherlands
Railway stations in the Netherlands opened in the 20th century